Sciota Township may refer to the following places in the United States:

 Sciota Township, McDonough County, Illinois
 Sciota Township, Shiawassee County, Michigan
 Sciota Township, Dakota County, Minnesota

See also

Sciota (disambiguation)

Township name disambiguation pages